Form class may refer to:
Form classification, in paleontology
Homeroom, in schools
Part of speech, in grammar

See also
Class (disambiguation)
Form (disambiguation)
Class formation (mathematics)